Ardin (also Romanized as Ardīn) is a village in Bam Rural District, Bam and Safiabad District, Esfarayen County, North Khorasan Province, Iran. At the 2006 census, its population was 323, in 97 families.

References 

Populated places in Esfarayen County